The backwater darter (Etheostoma zonifer) is a species of freshwater ray-finned fish, a darter from the subfamily Etheostomatinae, part of the family Percidae, which also contains the perches, ruffes and pikeperches. It is endemic to the eastern United States, where it occurs in coastal plain streams in the Mobile Bay drainage in Alabama and Mississippi. It occurs mud-bottomed, often vegetated, pools of sluggish creeks and small rivers.

References

Etheostoma
Fish described in 1935
Taxa named by Carl Leavitt Hubbs
Taxa named by Mott Dwight Cannon